Archery at the 2018 Summer Youth Olympics was held 12–17 October 2018 in Buenos Aires, Argentina.

The total of 64 athletes participated in the tournament. The archery competition took place at Parque Sarmiento (previously planned at Parque Polideportivo Roca in Villa Soldati).

Qualification
Each National Olympic Committee (NOC) can enter a maximum of 2 competitors, 1 per each gender. As hosts, Argentina was given the maximum quota. The spots were reallocated to the next best nations at the 2017 World Youth Championships. The remaining 54 places was decided by qualification events, namely the 2017 World Archery Youth Championships and five continental qualification tournaments. A further 8, 4 in each gender was to be decided by the Universality Places.

To be eligible to participate at the Youth Olympics athletes must have been born between 1 January 2001 and 31 December 2003. Furthermore, all archers must have achieved the following Minimum Qualification Score (MQS).

 Men: FITA round of 60m round of 610
 Women: FITA round of 60m round of 600

Qualification summary

Boys' qualification

Argentina declined its host nation quota, which was redistributed to the Americas qualifier.

Girls' qualification

Medal summary

Medal table

Medalists

References

External links
Official Results Book – Archery

 
Archery
2018
2018 in archery